Zviad Gogotchuri (born 30 October 1986) is a visually impaired Georgian Paralympic judoka. He won a gold medal at the 2016 Summer Paralympics in the 90 kg category. This marked his and Georgia's inaugural Paralympic medal.

After arriving to Japan for the 2021 Summer Paralympics, he was arrested for assaulting a security guard at a Tokyo hotel on 16 August 2021.

References

External links
 

Judoka at the 2016 Summer Paralympics
Paralympic gold medalists for Georgia (country)
Living people
1986 births
Male judoka from Georgia (country)
Medalists at the 2016 Summer Paralympics
Paralympic medalists in judo